Jonathan: The Boy Nobody Wanted is a 1992 American made-for-television biographical drama film starring JoBeth Williams and Chris Burke.  The film is directed by George Kaczender and inspired by a true story concerning a landmark legal decision for rights of the disabled.

Plot
Jonathan (Chris Burke), a youth with Down Syndrome, is institutionalized by his parents (Alley Mills and Tom Mason), who do not wish to be burdened with caring for him. Volunteer Ginny Moore (JoBeth Williams) spends time with Jonathan at the institution and eventually her own home, where he forges a bond with her and her family (Dana Barron, Chris Demetral, Jeffrey DeMunn). Jonathan's faculties improve with Ginny's care, but his heart problems become increasingly severe. His parents refuse to give consent for the medical procedure that would cure him, so Ginny sues to obtain guardianship of Jonathan so she can give permission for the treatment.

Cast

 JoBeth Williams as Ginny Moore 
 Chris Burke as Jonathan Willis 
 K.C. Clarizio as Jonathan Willis (age 6) 
 Brandon Bauer as Jonathan Willis (ages 11–13) 
 Dana Barron as Laurie Moore
 Chris Demetral as Brad Moore
 Madge Sinclair as Faye Lincoln
 Jeffrey DeMunn as Frank Moore 
 Tom Mason as Max Willis 
 Robert Cicchini as Neil Vogler 
 Mason Adams as Judge Colbert 
 Paul Linke as Dr. Sullivan 
 H. Richard Greene as Wolff 
 Alley Mills as Carol Willis 
 Lorraine Morin-Torre as Ada 
 Linden Chiles as Judge Martin 
 Damon Sharpe as Todd 
 Kim Delgado as Bailiff 
 Suzanne Reynolds as Reporter 
 Lauree Berger as Pat Greenway 
 Alicia Bergman as Sue Ann 
 Kaley Ward-Hummel as Newspaper Reporter 
 Judy Milstein as Impatient Orderly 
 Paul L. Nolan as D.A. 
 Dana Chelette as Orderly
 Mike Principato as Jonathan Willis' brother

References

External links
 

1992 films
1992 television films
American docudrama films
1990s biographical drama films
American films based on actual events
American biographical drama films
Down syndrome in television
NBC network original films
Films directed by George Kaczender
1992 drama films
American drama television films
1990s American films